Salar de Aguas Calientes is the name of several salt flats in Chile:

Salar de Aguas Calientes, part of Los Flamencos National Reserve
Salar de Aguas Calientes, close to Laguna Lejía
Salar de Aguas Calientes, part of Salar de Talar
Salar de Aguas Calientes IV